The Miami Toros was a professional soccer team in the North American Soccer League from 1972 to 1976. The club was founded in 1967 as the Washington Darts, and moved to Miami, where they played the 1972 season in the NASL's Southern Division as the Miami Gatos.  In 1973, the club rebranded as the Miami Toros.  Their home field was at times the Miami Orange Bowl, Tamiami Field and Miami Dade College's North Campus Stadium.

After the 1976 season, the team moved to Fort Lauderdale and became known as the Fort Lauderdale Strikers and later moved to Minnesota and became known as the Minnesota Strikers.

Prominent players included 1973 league MVP Warren Archibald who was from Point Fortin, the smallest borough in Trinidad and Tobago, and 1975 league MVP Juan Carlos Moramarco who was from Rosario, Argentina.

Beginning in 1975, the Toros had a rivalry with the Tampa Bay Rowdies that grew even fiercer after the Toros moved to Ft. Lauderdale and became the Strikers.

Year-by-year

Honors

NASL championships
 1974 runner-up

Division titles
 1974 Eastern Division

League MVP
 1973 Warren Archibald
 1975 Steve David

League scoring champion
 1975 Steve David (23 goals, 6 assists, 52 points)

League goal scoring champion
 1973 Warren Archibald (12 goals)
 1975 Steve David (23 goals)

Coach of the Year
 1974 John Young

All-Star first team selections
 1972 Willie Evans
 1973 Warren Archibald, David Sadler
 1974 Roberto Aguirre, Ronnie Sharp
 1975 Steve David, Ronnie Sharp

All-Star second team selections
 1972 Dave Metchick
 1973 Roberto Aguirre
 1974 Warren Archibald, Ralph Wright
 1975 Ralph Wright

All-Star honorable mentions
 1972 Warren Archibald, Billy Fraser
 1974 Steve David
 1976 Jim Holton

U.S. Soccer Hall of Fame
 2003 Ace Ntsoelengoe, Joe & Elizabeth Robbie

Former management

Head coaches

  Sal DeRosa (1972)
  John Young (1973–1974)
  Dr. Greg Myers (1975–1976)
  Ken Furphy (1976–1977)

Owners/GMs

 Garo Yepremian (1972)
 John Bilotta (1971–72)
 Joe Robbie (1973–76)
 Angel Lorie, Jr. (Managing Partner) (1972–75)
 Elizabeth Robbie (Managing Partner) (1976)

References

External links
Miami Toros rosters
Miami Gatos roster

 
North American Soccer League (1968–1984) teams
T
Soccer clubs in Florida
Defunct soccer clubs in Florida
Defunct indoor soccer clubs in the United States
1972 establishments in Florida
1976 disestablishments in Florida
Association football clubs established in 1972
Association football clubs disestablished in 1976